Roberto Antonio Nurse Anguiano (born 16 December 1983) is a former professional footballer who played as a striker. Born in Mexico, he represented the Panama national team.

Club career
Nurse is a three-year veteran of the Primera División (First Division), having made his top-flight debut with Colibríes de Morelos in 2003 at aged 19. From 2003 to 2005 he spent two years in the Primera División A, Mexico's second tier, with Cañeros de Zacatepec and Querétaro, before returning to the Primera División in 2005, playing 13 games with Atlante. Nurse was Querétaro's leading goalscorer in the Primera División A, registering a total of 17 goals between the Apertura 2007 and Clausura 2008 seasons.

Nurse signed for Chivas USA of Major League Soccer on 16 July 2008, and made his debut in Chivas's SuperLiga game against Santos Laguna the same day; he made his MLS debut on 9 August 2008, against Kansas City Wizards.

Veracruz signed Nurse for the Clausura 2009 tournament and after spells at Cruz Azul Hidalgo and La Piedad he joined UAT in June 2012. In December 2014 he moved on to Dorados de Sinaloa.

International career
Born in Mexico to a Afro-Panamanian father and a Mexican mother, Nurse was eligible to play for Mexico or Panama and on 31 May 2014 he made his debut for the Panama national football team coming in as a substitute during a 1–1 tie against Serbia, and scored his first international goal for Panama on a 2–2 tie against Costa Rica during the 2014 Copa Centroamericana.

In May 2018 he was named in Panama's preliminary 35 man squad for the 2018 World Cup in Russia. However, he did not make the final 23.

International goals
Scores and results list Panama's goal tally first.

Honours
Individual
Ascenso MX Golden Boot: Clausura 2014, Clausura 2015, Apertura 2016, Apertura 2018

See also
Afro-Mexicans
List of people from Morelos

References

External links

1983 births
Living people
Sportspeople from Cuernavaca
Footballers from Morelos
Mexican people of Panamanian descent
People with acquired Panamanian citizenship
Panamanian people of Mexican descent
Association football forwards
Mexican expatriate footballers
Panamanian footballers
Panamanian expatriate footballers
Panama international footballers
2014 Copa Centroamericana players
2015 CONCACAF Gold Cup players
Copa América Centenario players
Club Atlético Zacatepec players
Querétaro F.C. footballers
Club León footballers
Atlante F.C. footballers
Club Celaya footballers
Chivas USA players
C.D. Veracruz footballers
Guerreros de Hermosillo F.C. footballers
La Piedad footballers
Correcaminos UAT footballers
Dorados de Sinaloa footballers
Expatriate soccer players in the United States
Liga MX players
Ascenso MX players
Major League Soccer players
Mexican footballers